The Tanzania Agricultural Development Bank (TADB) is bank in Tanzania dedicated to farmers. The government has pledged to provide $500 million (TSh 850 bn) as working capital.

References

External links
 Background of TADB, Ministry of Finance
 Kikwete launches Agricultural bank, Michuzi Blog

Banks of Tanzania
Government-owned companies of Tanzania
Agricultural finance